HMS Growler was a paddle-driven  sloop, built in 1841 and broken up in 1854. In 1847 she carried liberated Africans to Sierra Leone for resettlement.

Construction and commissioning
Growler was ordered under PW1840 along with other Driver-class paddle sloops, laid down at Chatham Dockyard and launched on 20 July 1841. She was completed at Chatham and commissioned on 9 March 1842.

Service history
On 31 March 1842, Growler was assigned to the South East Coast of America Station to combat the slave trade. She was re-assigned to the West Africa Squadron in September 1844.

On 21 July 1844 Growler captured the Spanish brigantine Veterano. Then on 23 September 1844 Growler captured the Spanish slave schooner Concepcion.

In February 1845 she took part in Commodore William Jones's destruction of several barracoons at Dombocorro and elsewhere.

The ship was involved in a scheme to relocate liberated Africans from Sierra Leone to the Caribbean, arriving in Trinidad in December 1847. One hundred and fifty men, 37 women and 254 children former captives survived the journey, although 45 Africans died on the journey.

Fate
Growler was broken up at Portsmouth, which was completed by 17 January 1854.

Notes, citations, and references
Notes

Citations

References

 

Sloops of the Royal Navy
Ships built in Pembroke Dock
1841 ships
Victorian-era sloops of the United Kingdom